Technology Sales Leads (TSL), now TSL Marketing, is a multinational company providing outsourced sales and marketing solutions to companies worldwide, via its "Plan, Develop, Manage" integrated marketing methodology. Originally headquartered in Carlow (Ireland) and Boston (USA), the company has since relocated its headquarters to the Baltimore (United States) suburb of Elkridge, MD.

History

TSL was founded in Ireland, in 1999, by Michael Kelly (formerly of IONA Technologies) and David English (formerly of IBM). In 2001, TSL received investment funding from the Irish Government’s Enterprise Development Agency, Enterprise Ireland, under the "High Potential Start Up" (HPSU) program for international expansion and working capital purposes. This investment led to the launch of the company’s offices outside Ireland allowing it to serve its international clients from closer bases. The company announced an estimated 600% growth in its business in the year 2000 and was chosen to represent County Carlow in the final of the National Enterprise Awards 2000. In 2008, the company received 2008 Best of Boston Award from the US Local Business Association (USLBA).

The main line of business continued to be in its original offering, developing bespoke sales leads. The company is known for its IT channel marketing, or as they call it "Marketing Through Partners", which has become a significant part of its business. Marketing consulting workshops, especially with mid market business partners of the major IT vendors, has also become a significant part of TSL's offerings in recent times.

Services 
TSL Marketing started out as a traditional lead generation agency, offering telemarketing, creative services, and outbound marketing programs.

In 2008 they began expanding their digital inbound marketing programs. By 2010 their services include search engine optimization, paid online advertising, and website development. Again, in late 2014, the agency rounded out their offerings by adding conversion optimization, user experience testing, and digital marketing workshops for IBM.

TSL Marketing is also the sole broker for the domain, "pics.com".

Recognition and Partners 
 Google Certified Partner
 Hubspot Platinum Partner 
 IBM Channel Marketing Agency
 Hubspot 2015 Impact Award Winner

References

American companies established in 1999
International information technology consulting firms
International marketing research companies